Hoogveld is a surname. Notable people with the surname include:

Jacobus Hoogveld (1884–1948), Dutch athlete
Hans Hoogveld (born 1947), Dutch water polo player
Niek Hoogveld (born 1999), Dutch footballer 
 

Dutch-language surnames